"The Why of Fry" is the tenth episode in the fourth season of the American animated television series Futurama. It originally aired on the Fox network in the United States on April 6, 2003. The episode was written by David X. Cohen and directed by Wes Archer. In this episode, it is revealed that Fry's cryogenic freezing and arrival in the 31st century was not an accident, but a calculated plot by Nibbler to save the universe. Along with "Where No Fan Has Gone Before" (which directly succeeds this episode in production order), it is one of two episodes that do not feature Professor Farnsworth.

Plot
Fry feels useless after Leela and Bender return from an extremely successful mission without him. Leela asks Fry to walk Nibbler while she goes on a date with Chaz, the mayor's aide. Fry is convinced the only good he serves is to clean up after Nibbler, but Nibbler tells him otherwise. Having never heard Nibbler talk, Fry is dumbfounded as Nibbler knocks him out and takes him to Eternium, Nibbler's home planet. The Nibblonians explain that because Fry lacks the delta brainwave on account of his being his own grandfather (seen in "Roswell That Ends Well"), he was immune to the attack of the Brainspawn a few months prior (seen in "The Day the Earth Stood Stupid").

The Nibblonians reveal the Brainspawn's plan to collect all knowledge in the universe, store it in a colossal memory bank called the Infosphere, and destroy the rest of the universe. Because of his immunity, Fry is the only person who can stop them. The Nibblonians give Fry a "Quantum Interphase Bomb" which will send the sphere into an alternate dimension forever, as well as a wind-up toy vessel with which to reach and escape the Infosphere. Fry successfully plants the bomb, but is detected; when he tries to escape, his vessel falls apart. Fry activates the bomb anyway, and despite being doomed to enter the alternate universe, he is glad that his life had a purpose.

The Brainspawn show Fry something that happened on December 31, 1999, the night he was frozen (seen in "Space Pilot 3000"). Fry is upset to see that Nibbler tipped him into the cryogenic chamber and sent him to the year 3000. Nibbler explains that he had to do so, as Fry was the only person who could defeat the Brainspawn. The bomb detonates, sending the Infosphere to the alternate dimension. Meanwhile, Leela goes on her date with Chaz. Chaz reserves the rocket skating rink for Leela, but Leela dumps him after he turns away the Cookieville orphans who were supposed to visit the rink.

In the alternate dimension, the Brainspawn discover they can send Fry back in time to stop Nibbler from freezing him. Fry accepts their offer and is transported to the cryogenics lab. He appears behind Nibbler under the desk, just before his past self is frozen. He restrains Nibbler, who protests that Fry must be sent to the future to save the universe. Nibbler asks if there is anything he wants to save in the future, and Fry mentions Leela. After Nibbler advises Fry not to give up on her, and promises that he will help Fry win Leela's heart, Fry tips his past self into the cryogenic chamber. As Fry finds himself disappearing from the timeline, he has enough time to tell Nibbler the vessel he was given was not suitable for the task.

In the future, Fry plants the bomb again and successfully escapes the Infosphere, having been given an upgraded vessel this time. Nibbler and Fry return to Earth, and Nibbler gives Fry a flower before blanking Fry's mind. Back at Planet Express, Fry gives Leela the flower. Leela tells Fry that although he may not be the most important person in the universe, she is happy to see him and kisses him.

Continuity
David X. Cohen notes that he was particularly enthusiastic to write this episode because of how it tied into other episodes, feeling that it was something that was rarely done in sitcoms, particularly cartoons. He points out that the writing staff tried to tie as many episodes together as possible regardless of whether they were originally written with that intent. The episode contains flashbacks to the events of "Space Pilot 3000" when Fry is originally frozen. Cohen points out that Nibbler's shadow is present in the pilot episode, a point which is explained in this episode, and that this was a plot point which was planned since the pilot. Jokes about the extreme mass of Nibbler's feces and mention of Vergon 6 call back to "Love's Labours Lost in Space". The planet Eternium, the Brainspawn, and the delta brainwave concept were originally introduced in "The Day the Earth Stood Stupid". A joke about Fry becoming his own grandfather is a reference to the events of "Roswell That Ends Well". Cohen also notes that in the episode "Jurassic Bark", a shot of Nibbler's third eye sticking out of a trash can is included as a reference to these events as well, an item which many fans had noticed.

Production
David X. Cohen states in the episode commentary that he was eager to write this episode in part because it was something that had been discussed since the very beginning of the show.  They had wanted to show that there was a larger conspiracy that had brought Fry to the future and notes on more than one occasion that this was something that had been planned since the pilot. Creator Matt Groening also notes that they had planned to hold off on using time travel plot lines until the series was better established. Cohen jokes that perhaps they should have explored this plot point earlier however since at the time the episode commentary was recorded it had become clear that the series would be ending. Cohen also thought it was important that the episode explored Fry's option of returning to the past and the question of whether he was happier in the past or in the future.

This episode contains a scene which re-enacts events from the pilot episode, "Space Pilot 3000", after they have been changed by the events of this episode. The episode is so similar to the pilot that the animation director even jokes that the animators charged their time twice for the parts that were taken from the pilot. In actuality, some of Billy West's lines in this episode are taken directly from the voice track for the pilot, specifically Fry's lines as he enters Applied Cryogenics.

Broadcast and reception
IGN ranked the episode as number twenty in their list of the "Top 25 Futurama Episodes" in 2006 because although the episode was not the funniest episode in the series, it had a fun story and was a "great continuation" to "The Day the Earth Stood Stupid".

References

External links

The Why of Fry at The Infosphere.

Futurama (season 4) episodes
2003 American television episodes
Television episodes about time travel
Television episodes written by David X. Cohen
Fiction featuring the turn of the third millennium